This is a list of chairmen (Speakers) of the Supreme Council:

This is a list of presidents (Speakers) of the Great Khural of Tuva:

Sources

Lists of legislative speakers in Russia
Presidents